Group Home is a hip hop duo, composed of members Lil' Dap (birth name James Heath; b. March 6, 1972) and Melachi the Nutcracker (birth name Jamal Felder; b. October 5, 1977). They came to prominence as members of the Gang Starr Foundation. Lil' Dap made his rhyming debut on Gang Starr's 1992 classic Daily Operation on the song "I'm the Man". Both members appeared on Gang Starr's critically acclaimed 1994 effort Hard to Earn, on the tracks "Speak Ya Clout" and "Words from the Nutcracker". In 1995, the group released its debut album, Livin' Proof. The album was very well received, mainly due to DJ Premier's advanced production work, described by Allmusic as "rhythmic masterpieces". A second album A Tear for the Ghetto was released in 1999, this time with only one track produced by DJ Premier.

Since then, little has been heard of the group. Lil' Dap released a solo single, "Brooklyn Zone", in 2001, and guested on several other releases. , Lil' Dap is an independent artist. He released in 2008 a solo album called I.A.Dap. In 1996 they toured with Cypress Hill and Brotherhood in London, UK. In 2008 they featured with Clipse at the Highline Ballroom in New York. In 2017 they performed at the OUT4FAME Festival in Germany and the Royal Arena Festival in the UK.

Discography

References

External links
Group Home at discogs.com

African-American musical groups
American musical duos
Five percenters
Hip hop duos
Rappers from Brooklyn
Hip hop groups from New York City
Hardcore hip hop groups
FFRR Records artists
Gang Starr Foundation members